"Silly Sally" is a song by Iron Butterfly that was released as a single in 1971 after the departure of Doug Ingle. Mike Pinera and M. Jones wrote "Silly Sally" in an attempt to keep the band together. Though the usual B-side is "Stone Believer", it has also been issued with "Butterfly Bleu" (voice box solo) on the B-side. The single did not chart and in 1971 Iron Butterfly disbanded.

Track listing
Side one
 "Silly Sally" (M. Pinera, M. Jones) – 2:12

Side two
 "Stone Believer" (Doug Ingle, Ron Bushy, Lee Dorman) – 4:25

Personnel
Doug Ingle – organ and lead vocals on "Stone Believer"
Mike Pinera – guitar, lead vocals
Larry "Rhino" Reinhardt – guitar
Lee Dorman – bass, backing vocals
Ron Bushy – drums
Diane Adams – background vocals on "Silly Sally"

References 

1971 singles
Iron Butterfly songs
Songs written by Mike Pinera
1970 songs